Isaac Leonard Kahdot (October 22, 1899 – March 31, 1999) was a third baseman in Major League Baseball. Nicknamed "Chief", he played for the Cleveland Indians in 1922.

Kahdot was a Potawatomi who grew up in a mostly Indigenous village in Oklahoma and attended Haskell Institute.

Kahdot was one of a group of players whom Indians player-manager Tris Speaker sent in during the game on September 21, 1922, which was done as an opportunity for fans to see various minor league prospects.

After the 1923 season, the Indians asked him to play for a minor league team in Grand Rapids in the Michigan-Ontario League but he declined, having moved to Coffeyville, Kansas with his family. Kahdot continued playing minor league baseball until 1941 and worked as a derrickman in oilfields until 1958 at which point he took a job at Tinker Air Force Base for 11 years until retirement. At the time of his death, he was the oldest living former major league player.

References

External links

1899 births
1999 deaths
Bartlesville Reds players
Baseball players from Oklahoma
Cleveland Indians players
Major League Baseball third basemen
Native American sportspeople
Potawatomi people
Coffeyville Refiners players
Henderson Gamecocks players
Charlotte Hornets (baseball) players
Columbia Comers players
Dallas Steers players
Independence Producers players
Oklahoma City Indians players
Pittsburg Pirates players
Salisbury-Spencer Colonials players
San Antonio Bears players